The 2013 International V8 Supercars Championship (often simplified to the 2013 V8 Supercars Championship) was a Fédération Internationale de l'Automobile-sanctioned international motor racing series for V8 Supercars that was based in Australia. It was the fifteenth running of the V8 Supercar Championship Series and the seventeenth series in which V8 Supercars contested the premier Australian touring car title. The championship was contested over thirty-six races, starting with the Clipsal 500 Adelaide on 2 March 2013, and finishing with the Sydney 500 on 8 December. The series' calendar also expanded, travelling to the United States for the first time for a race at the Circuit of the Americas in Austin, Texas.

The 2013 season saw the introduction of the "New Generation V8 Supercar", a revision to the regulations which were designed to cut costs and to make the series more attractive to new manufacturers. Nissan and Mercedes-Benz entered the series, with four Nissan Altimas being prepared by Kelly Racing and three Mercedes-Benz E63 W212s being run by Erebus Motorsport — who purchased Stone Brothers Racing during the off-season – respectively. Holden teams competed with the new VF Commodore, which replaces the VE model, whilst Ford continued to use the FG Falcon, which had been raced since 2009, but built to New Generation V8 Supercar specifications for the 2013 season.

Jamie Whincup started the season as the defending drivers' champion. The team for which he drives, Triple Eight Race Engineering, are the defending teams' champions. Whincup successfully defended his title, winning eleven of the season's thirty-six races and scoring a record-breaking thirteen pole positions. His team-mate Craig Lowndes finished second in the championship for the third consecutive season, giving Triple Eight Race Engineering its fourth consecutive Teams Championship win. Lowndes, with Warren Luff, won the inaugural Enduro Cup for the best performing drivers across the three endurance races. Ford Performance Racing driver Will Davison finished the season in third place. Rick Kelly finished the highest of the Nissan drivers, in fourteenth place, while Lee Holdsworth ended the season in twentieth to be the highest placed Erebus Motorsport driver.

Teams and drivers
The following teams and drivers competed during the 2013 championship:

Team changes
 All teams competing with the Holden Commodore upgraded to the new VF model.
 After switching from Holden to Ford after the first event of the 2011 season, Tony D'Alberto Racing moved back to Holden in 2013, where the team received technical assistance from Walkinshaw Performance.
 Ford Performance Racing expanded to a four-car operation with the acquisition of the #18 Racing Entitlement Contract held by Charlie Schwerkolt, which was used by Dick Johnson Racing to run James Moffat's car in 2012. The fourth car is run as a satellite of the team, in the same way as the #55 Rod Nash Racing car is run.
 In January 2013, British motorsport group Prodrive announced that it had sold its stake in Ford Performance Racing to Rod Nash and former Australian GT Champion Rusty French.
 Lucas Dumbrell Motorsport expanded to a two-car operation after purchasing the #49 Racing Entitlement Contract from Paul Morris Motorsport. The team also acquired two VF Commodores constructed by Triple Eight Race Engineering.
 As a result of the deals between Schwerkolt and Ford Performance Racing and Paul Morris and Lucas Dumbrell Motorsport, Dick Johnson Racing lost the use of the #18 and #49 Racing Entitlement Contracts and was reduced to a two-car operation with its existing #17 REC and by leasing Triple F Racing's #12 REC.
 Kelly Racing switched from competing with Holden Commodores to Nissan Altimas, running a re-sleeved version of Nissan's quad-cam aluminium 5.6-litre VK56DE V8 reconfigured to a 5.0-litre capacity. The team was renamed to Nissan Motorsport, a name last used by Gibson Motorsport in 1991.
 In January 2013, Larry Perkins confirmed that he had sold his two Racing Entitlement Contracts to Kelly Racing. Perkins had previously leased the #11 and #16 RECs to the Kelly operation, and by purchasing them, Kelly Racing acquired full control over the licences. To satisfy sponsor requirements, the 2 former Perkins RECs used numbers 36 and 360.
 Stone Brothers Racing was purchased by Australian GT Championship team Erebus Motorsport, and the organisation, along with satellite team James Rosenberg Racing, ended their association with Ford. Instead, the combined team entered three cars based on the Mercedes-Benz E63 W212, powered by a M159 engine. The combined Erebus—James Rosenberg outfit did not receive any factory support from Mercedes-Benz.
 Vodafone announced it would not renew its sponsorship with Triple Eight Race Engineering at the end of 2012. Red Bull took over as the naming rights from Vodafone and the team started competing as Red Bull Racing Australia.

Driver changes
 Tim Blanchard joined V8 Supercars full-time, driving for Dick Johnson Racing. Blanchard, who was runner-up in the 2010 Fujitsu V8 Supercar Series, had previously contested the endurance races in 2011 and 2012 before replacing the injured Todd Kelly for the final four events of the 2012 season.
 Michael Caruso left Garry Rogers Motorsport after five seasons, moving to Kelly Racing.
 Alex Davison returned to V8 Supercars after a one-year absence spent competing in the Australian Carrera Cup Championship. He joined Charlie Schwerkolt Racing, a satellite team of Ford Performance Racing.
 Taz Douglas left the category after one year racing for Lucas Dumbrell Motorsport, returning to the Dunlop V8 Supercar Series.
 Former Deutsche Tourenwagen Masters driver Maro Engel made his V8 Supercar debut in 2013. Engel, who drove for Mercedes-Benz in the Deutsche Tourenwagen Masters series between 2008 and 2011, continued his association with the brand, driving an E63 AMG prepared by Erebus Motorsport.
 Dean Fiore moved from Dick Johnson Racing to Lucas Dumbrell Motorsport, but continued to lease the Triple F Racing REC to Dick Johnson.
 Steven Johnson was forced out of his seat at Dick Johnson Racing as a result of the team's on-going financial troubles. He took on the position of general manager in the team's organisational structure, whilst contesting the Australian Carrera Cup Championship.
 Reigning second-tier V8 Supercar champion and New Zealand V8SuperTourer champion Scott McLaughlin joined Garry Rogers Motorsport full-time having raced for the team as an emergency replacement in the final race of the 2012 season.
 James Moffat left Dick Johnson Racing to join Kelly Racing.
 Greg Murphy left Kelly Racing at the end of 2012. Murphy was unable to find a competitive team to race with in 2013 and joined the Holden Racing Team for the endurance races, but left open the possibility of making individual "wildcard" entries at selected events.
 Michael Patrizi left V8 Supercars and return to the Australian Carrera Cup Championship.
 Scott Pye, who placed second in the 2012 Dunlop V8 Supercar Series, joined Lucas Dumbrell Motorsport.
 2012 V8SuperTourer runner-up Jonny Reid joined Dick Johnson Racing.
 Karl Reindler left Kelly Racing at the end of 2012, and moved to the Australian Carrera Cup Championship.
 At the end of the 2012 season, Shane van Gisbergen announced plans to leave the category in order to rejuvenate himself and consider his future. In January 2013, he announced that he would re-enter the championship, driving for Tekno Autosports.

Mid-season changes
 Jonny Reid was replaced by Dunlop Series driver Chaz Mostert prior to the Chill Perth 360.
 Following a major accident at the Phillip Island event, James Courtney was forced to miss the Sydney 500. He was replaced by the Holden Racing Team's endurance co-driver, Nick Percat.

Season calendar
The 2013 calendar was released on 15 October 2012. The season consisted of thirty-six races to be held at fourteen venues in Australia, New Zealand and the United States, plus an additional non-championship event that was held at the Melbourne Grand Prix Circuit in support of the 2013 Australian Grand Prix.

Calendar changes

 The Circuit of the Americas in Austin, Texas hosted an event of the championship on 17–19 May. The series used the shorter "national" circuit, instead of the full layout.
 The Hamilton 400 was held for the final time in 2012. It was replaced by an event at Pukekohe Park Raceway, which last hosted a championship event in 2007. The Pukekohe Park circuit was reconfigured to accommodate the category after it was awarded "International" status by the FIA in 2011. This act required the circuit to meet the criteria for an FIA Grade-2 certification, necessitating the changes.
 After returning to the calendar in 2012, the Sydney Motorsport Park did not host an event in 2013.
 The Yas Marina Circuit was initially scheduled to host the Yas V8 400 in support of the 2013 Abu Dhabi Grand Prix, but with the Grand Prix support bill expanding to include rounds of the GP2 and GP3 Series championships, the event was removed from the V8 Supercars calendar.

Format changes
 The events at Symmons Plains, Barbagallo, Hidden Valley, Queensland Raceway, Winton and Phillip Island all featured a new three-race format, dubbed the "60/60 Sprint" format. The Saturday race was 120-kilometres in length but split into two 60-kilometre halves with a fifteen-minute break in between to allow teams the opportunity to service their cars. The starting grid for the second half of the race was determined by the finishing order of the first half of the race. The remaining two races were then held on Sunday at 100-kilometres in length each. Originally, a driver who finished one lap down in the first half would remain one lap down at the start of the second half of the race. This was changed following the Symmons Plains event, with drivers who were a lap down at the end of the first half gaining the lap back for the second half.
 Teams were no longer required to compete with a co-driver from an international racing series for the Gold Coast 600. Instead, teams were free to partner each of their drivers with any co-driver they choose, and allowed to enter the same co-drivers for the Sandown 500, Bathurst 1000 and Gold Coast 600. The drivers with the most points from the three endurance races received the "Enduro Cup", a new trophy introduced for 2013.

Rule changes

New Generation V8 Supercar
The New Generation V8 Supercar (originally Car of the Future) project was first announced in 2008, when a working group was established to explore options for the long-term future of the category. The study found that in the fifteen years since the category had been restricted to a two manufacturers, the costs of building and racing with a competitive car had doubled, with some estimates putting the cost as high as A$600,000 per car, per season.

The Car of the Future program was created to address this, aiming to reduce running costs to $250,000. This was achieved through the use of "control" parts; where teams had previously been charged with designing and developing their own parts, the Car of the Future regulations called for these parts to be built independently and to a set specification. The basic chassis and roll cage, differential, brakes, cooling and fuel systems and rear suspension were all changed to control parts.

The category also introduced a larger fuel tank to combat the phenomenon of "economy racing" whereby drivers would be forced to drive conservatively late in the race so as to preserve enough fuel to reach the finish. The larger tanks and a restructuring of event formats to include more compulsory pit stops instead allowed drivers to push as hard as they pleased until the end of the race.

Manufacturers were free to develop their own aerodynamic aids to suit their cars, which were then put through a rigorous system of parity testing so as to refine the aerodynamics of each model of car so as to prevent one model from having a distinct advantage over the others. Finally, manufacturers were also given the option of using "generic" engines developed by the category and re-badged to reflect the manufacturer using them—though as the season started, no manufacturers had elected to do so—or developing their own engines, which would be built to specifications and then be subject to a process of homologation to ensure that all engines developed by the manufacturer would be identical. In order to ensure the cars can remain competitive, the process of homologation only applies to the basic engine platform, which teams will be free to develop over the course of the season.

With the requirement that all teams build brand-new cars for the 2013 season, most of the cars that were raced in 2011 and 2012 were sold to teams competing in the V8 Development Series, the second-tier category for V8 Supercars.

In November 2013 the Car of the Future was officially renamed the New Generation V8 Supercar.

Event summaries

Clipsal 500 Adelaide

The first race of the season took place on the streets of Adelaide and saw Triple Eight Race Engineering emerge with a firm hold on the championship lead. Craig Lowndes won the first of the two races after pole-sitter Shane van Gisbergen made a poor start and ultimately retired from the race. Will Davison finished second, with reigning drivers' champion Jamie Whincup completing the podium. Van Gisbergen claimed pole in the second race and went on to win by two seconds ahead of Whincup. Lowndes recovered from a poor qualifying session to finish third, giving him a twelve-point championship lead over Whincup, and a thirty-one point lead over Davison in third place. Rick Kelly achieved a best finish of eleventh place for Nissan in the first race, whilst the Mercedes-Benz E63 AMGs prepared by Erebus Motorsport struggled throughout the weekend, with Tim Slade recording a best result of fifteenth place.

Tasmania Microsoft Office 365

Brad Jones Racing won all three of the races at the next event of the championship in Tasmania. Fabian Coulthard secured his maiden V8 Supercars race win in the first race, while Jason Bright took his first race win since the 2011 Winton 300 when he won the second race. Coulthard took a second win in the third and final race. Craig Lowndes lost the championship lead after an altercation with Shane van Gisbergen in the first race that saw Lowndes spin and puncture a tyre, leaving him to finish the race in twenty-sixth position, and Whincup gained the championship lead by finishing on the podium in the first race. David Reynolds and Scott Pye were involved in separate accidents over the course of the meeting, the latter of which ruled Pye out of the next event in New Zealand.

ITM 400 Auckland

The next event in New Zealand saw four different winners in four races. Scott McLaughlin became the youngest person to win a V8 Supercar race when he took his maiden victory in the first race as pole-sitter Jamie Whincup struggled with tyre problems at the start. Whincup survived a chaotic second race—in which Fabian Coulthard jumped the start; Shane van Gisbergen, Jason Bright and James Courtney all left the circuit at high speed; and Mark Winterbottom collided with Whincup whilst trying to pass for the lead on the last lap—to take his first win of the season. A rare mistake from Whincup saw him run wide in the third race, which was won by Will Davison, also in his—and Ford's—first win of the season. Jason Bright won the fourth race, and with it the Jason Richards Memorial Trophy, as he scored the most points over the four races. Whincup's tyre problems in the first race and off-track excursion in the third meant that he lost the lead of the championship to Will Davison, whose lead was further established when Whincup was penalised fifteen points for an unsportsmanlike pass in the third race.

Chill Perth 360

Triple Eight Race Engineering performed a clean sweep of the fourth event of the series at Barbagallo Raceway, with Craig Lowndes winning the 60/60 sprint race on Saturday. This was Lowndes' ninety-first career race win, breaking Mark Skaife's record of ninety wins. Jamie Whincup went on to win the following two races, and also took pole position for the first and third races; Jason Bright qualified on pole for the second. Whincup's wins, coupled with a second place in the first race, allowed him to take the championship lead back from Will Davison, who suffered a puncture in the first race. James Moffat provided Nissan Motorsport with three top ten results, continuing the team's strong form from New Zealand. Engine upgrades for Erebus Motorsport saw the Mercedes-Benz E63 AMGs find pace, with Maro Engel giving the team its first top ten qualifying result. Chaz Mostert, replacing Jonny Reid at Dick Johnson Racing, made a strong championship debut, finishing in the top fifteen in all three races. The Saturday race saw a major incident involving Scott Pye, who was launched into the air sideways and landed heavily in the infield after he made contact with Rick Kelly and Garth Tander coming onto the back straight during the first race. Pye was uninjured and the car undamaged and the team was able to continue racing throughout the weekend.

Austin 400

Triple Eight Race Engineering dominated V8 Supercars' first foray into the United States, with Jamie Whincup winning three of the four races at the Circuit of the Americas near Austin, Texas. Fabian Coulthard denied Whincup a clean sweep of the event when he won the third race. Whincup later caused controversy when he claimed that "external factors" had inspired an unorthodox penalty that he, Coulthard and Craig Lowndes were given for breaching safety car regulations in the third race, implying that the penalty had been applied to allow a different driver to win the race. Elsewhere, Rick Kelly demonstrated the Nissan Altima L33's development by securing four top-ten finishes, whilst James Moffat claimed an extra top-ten finish for the marque in the second race. Erebus Motorsport, on the other hand, continued their difficult introduction to V8 Supercars, spending most of the weekend outside the top twenty.

Skycity Triple Crown

David Reynolds took the second pole position of his career at Hidden Valley Raceway and despite leading the 60/60 Sprint race at the halfway mark, contact with Mark Winterbottom robbed him of the chance to take his maiden victory. Jamie Whincup went on to win the race ahead of Shane van Gisbergen, who had spent most of practice struggling with mechanical problems, and James Courtney. Courtney claimed his first pole position since the Winton event in the 2010 season for the second race, whilst Reynolds bounced back from his difficulties in the sprint race to take pole again. Winterbottom recovered from the Saturday incident to win the second race from Courtney and Craig Lowndes, while Lowndes would win the third race ahead of Winterbottom and Reynolds. Whincup was given a drive-through penalty in the third race for spinning his wheels while the car was in the air, allowing Lowndes to close the points gap in the championship. James Rosenberg Racing's Tim Slade demonstrated a reversal of fortunes for the Mercedes AMG E63 teams, finishing in the top ten in the first race and qualifying inside the top ten for the second and third races. However, his luck ran out on the first lap in the third race when he was involved in a multi-car accident which caused a red flag and eliminated himself, Lee Holdsworth, Alex Davison, Dean Fiore, David Wall, Alexandre Prémat and James Moffat. Scott McLaughlin, Jason Bright, Fabian Coulthard and Russell Ingall were also involved in the crash but were able to take part in the restarted race. German driver Maro Engel scored a career-best ninth place in the third race, capitalising on the first lap crash.

Sucrogen Townsville 400

The seventh event in Townsville saw mixed results. Series veteran Russell Ingall made his 226th championship event start, breaking John Bowe's record of 225, and used the number 226 in celebration of the achievement. Shane van Gisbergen continued his strong street circuit form from Adelaide, taking pole position for the Saturday race. However, a penalty from a pit lane infringement dropped him down the order. The Ford Performance Racing duo of Will Davison and Mark Winterbottom were able to capitalise on this and take a one-two finish ahead of Brad Jones Racing's Fabian Coulthard. Winterbottom took pole for the second race on Sunday but lost out on strategy, after many drivers pitted during an early safety car to do a double stint on soft tyres. The Holden Racing Team utilised this strategy to finish first and second, their first win since the 2011 Bathurst 1000, with Garth Tander leading James Courtney. Van Gisbergen rounded out the podium while Winterbottom finished fourth. Championship leaders Triple Eight Race Engineering endured a difficult weekend, with both Jamie Whincup and Craig Lowndes qualifying outside of the top ten for the first race. Lowndes was able to recover to fourth using an alternative strategy while Whincup finished seventh. The team was not able to recover over night, with Lowndes and Whincup finishing seventh and eleventh respectively on Sunday. Lowndes was able to take 48 points out of Whincup's championship lead, bringing it down from 159 to 111 points. Erebus Motorsport again finished in the top ten, with Tim Slade finishing eighth on Sunday. The Sunday race also saw Tony D'Alberto equal his career-best result with a sixth place while Ingall returned to the top ten with a fifth.

Coates Hire Ipswich 360

Triple Eight Race Engineering returned to form at Queensland Raceway, with Jamie Whincup winning the 60/60 Sprint race from pole position ahead of Scott McLaughlin and Mark Winterbottom. The race featured several incidents, firstly with Whincup's teammate Craig Lowndes touching the rear of Winterbottom's car on the first lap and causing both Winterbottom and Fabian Coulthard to lose positions. Todd Kelly had separate altercations with David Wall and Chaz Mostert, with Wall and Mostert coming off worse in each incident. Lee Holdsworth was forced out of the race after contact with Dean Fiore and Michael Caruso. Whincup again took pole for the second race but was beaten by McLaughlin for the race win, with James Courtney finishing third. The final race featured tyre problems which affected many drivers: Whincup, McLaughlin, Courtney, Garth Tander, Alex Davison and David Wall all had punctures which dropped them down the order. In just his fifteenth race, Chaz Mostert of Dick Johnson Racing won the race from second on the grid, ahead of pole-sitter Will Davison and Winterbottom. It was the first victory for Dick Johnson Racing since November 2010.

Winton 360

James Moffat took his first win and the maiden victory for Nissan Motorsport in the 60/60 Sprint race at Winton, Nissan's first win in an Australian Touring Car Championship or V8 Supercar race since 1992. His teammate Michael Caruso, who led the first half of the race, finished in second with Jason Bright completing the podium for Brad Jones Racing. Controversy surrounded Moffat's victory, however, as the two Nissans used an E70 fuel blend (compared to the usual E85) in an effort to evaluate its potential in balancing fuel economy between the engines used by Nissan and Erebus Motorsport and those used by Ford and Holden. Championship leader and pole-sitter Jamie Whincup encountered a gearbox problem while leading, forcing his retirement. Whincup's troubles continued in the second race, involved in a first lap crash after qualifying poorly. The crash also affected Caruso, Alex Davison, Russell Ingall, Alexandre Prémat and Garth Tander. Mark Winterbottom won the race for Ford Performance Racing, ahead of pole-sitter Bright and James Courtney. Courtney started on pole for the final race and went on to win ahead of Fabian Coulthard and Chaz Mostert. The race saw differing strategies with many drivers pitting for fresh tyres during a late safety car period and then making their way through the field.

Wilson Security Sandown 500

Jamie Whincup and Triple Eight Race Engineering recovered from their troubles at Winton to win the Sandown 500, with Paul Dumbrell co-driving the winning car. The win came despite a drive-through penalty for spinning the rear wheels while the car was jacked up during a pit stop. The pair finished ahead of their teammates Craig Lowndes and Warren Luff and the pole-sitting Ford Performance Racing car of Will Davison and Steve Owen. Erebus Motorsport achieved its best result of the season, with Lee Holdsworth and Craig Baird taking their E63 AMG to fourth place. Ashley Walsh, driving with Tim Blanchard for Dick Johnson Racing, had a major accident at the end of the back straight on lap 35, significantly damaging the car.

Supercheap Auto Bathurst 1000

An intense finish to the race saw Mark Winterbottom and Steven Richards win the Supercheap Auto Bathurst 1000 for Ford Performance Racing. It was Winterbottom's and the team's first victory in the race, while Richards won his third and Ford won their first since 2008. The winners of the Sandown 500, Jamie Whincup and Paul Dumbrell, finished second after Winterbottom and Whincup fought for the lead in the final stint, with their Triple Eight Race Engineering teammates Craig Lowndes and Warren Luff in third. Scott Pye achieved his best result of the season, finishing sixth with Paul Morris, while the wildcard entry of Andy Priaulx and Mattias Ekström performed strongly to finish in tenth. The race was the quickest in history at six hours, eleven minutes and twenty-seven seconds with only two safety car periods. The first was to allow the clean-up of debris after David Russell struck a kangaroo at Griffins Bend while a heavy crash for Greg Murphy at Reid Park brought about the second safety car period. Despite finishing second, Whincup extended his championship over Lowndes by eighteen points, while Winterbottom overtook teammate Will Davison for third in the standings.

Armor All Gold Coast 600

The twelfth event on the Gold Coast saw Craig Lowndes take the championship lead from Triple Eight Race Engineering teammate Jamie Whincup after Whincup and co-driver Paul Dumbrell failed to finish the Saturday race, with Dumbrell causing a heavy crash for Greg Murphy before suffering a drive-train failure. Lowndes and co-driver Warren Luff won the race from pole ahead of Shane van Gisbergen and Jeroen Bleekemolen, the first Dutchman to stand on a V8 Supercar podium, and Mark Winterbottom and Steven Richards. David Reynolds won the first race of his career in the Sunday race, with he and co-driver Dean Canto winning from pole. Fabian Coulthard and Luke Youlden finished second ahead of Russell Ingall and Ryan Briscoe, Briscoe's first podium finish and Ingall's first since 2009. James Courtney and Murphy looked set to take victory until a steering problem put them out of the race. Whincup and Dumbrell finished fourth while Lowndes and Luff were eighth, leaving Lowndes with a six-point championship lead. Lowndes and Luff won the Endurance Cup ahead of Whincup and Dumbrell and Winterbottom and Richards.

Sargent Security Phillip Island 360

The Holden Racing Team's Garth Tander took his second win of the season in the 60/60 Sprint race at Phillip Island, ahead of Fabian Coulthard and Alex Davison, who scored his first podium of the season. The race included on a controversial incident between Craig Lowndes and Mark Winterbottom, who came together while battling for the lead on the last lap of the first half of the race, resulting in the pair dropping to fifteenth and fifth places respectively. Other incidents during the first half allowed Jamie Whincup, who had qualified poorly, to move up to sixth place. Whincup would go on to finish fourth in the race to retake the championship lead while Winterbottom finished fifth and Lowndes recovered to eighth. The race was marred by a major accident involving Alexandre Prémat and James Courtney. Prémat had a tyre failure going into turn three before sliding across the damp grass and hitting the driver's door of Courtney's car, causing significant damage to both cars while Courtney also suffered slight tissue damage on his right leg. Triple Eight Race Engineering dominated Sunday's races, with Lowndes winning the first race ahead of teammate Whincup and Shane van Gisbergen. Whincup went on to win the final race ahead of Winterbottom and Lowndes. This left Whincup with a 20-point lead over Lowndes in the championship heading into the final round, with Winterbottom 124 points off the lead.

Sydney NRMA Motoring and Services 500

Championship standings

Points system
Points were awarded for each race at an event, to the driver/s of a car that completed at least 75% of the race distance and was running at the completion of the race, up to a maximum of 300 points per event.

 Single-race events: Sandown 500, Bathurst 1000
 Two-race events: Adelaide 500, Townsville 400, Gold Coast 600, Sydney 500
 Three-race events: Tasmania 360, Perth 360, Skycity Darwin Triple Crown, Ipswich 360, Winton 360, Phillip Island 360
 Four-race events: Auckland 400, Austin 400

Drivers' Championship

Pirtek Endurance Cup

Teams championship

Notes:
‡ — Denotes a single-car team.

Footnotes

See also
 V8 Supercars
 2013 V8 Supercar season
 2013 Dunlop V8 Supercar Series

References

2013
2013 in V8 Supercars
2013 in motorsport